Gaetano "Guy" Zangari is an Australian politician. He has been a Labor Party member of the New South Wales Legislative Assembly since March 2011, representing the electorate of Fairfield.

Zangari was a teacher at various high schools in Western Sydney for over 16 years. He spent over eight years teaching at Patrician Brothers' College, Fairfield, and most recently was a Pastoral Care Coordinator at Freeman Catholic College in Bonnyrigg.

On 18 November 2010, he was preselected unopposed for the seat of Fairfield to replace the former Member, Joe Tripodi, who announced he would be quitting parliament at the 2011 NSW state election. Zangari won with 40.7% of the votes, compared to Liberal Party candidate Charbel Saliba who received 37.9%.

At the 2015 NSW state election, Guy secured 53.71% of the formal vote after preferences giving him a 15.2-point swing back to Labor. At the 2019 NSW State Election, Guy increased his percentage of the vote to 57.23%.

He will not be re-contesting his seat in the 2023 New South Wales state election.

References

Living people
Members of the New South Wales Legislative Assembly
Australian politicians of Italian descent
Australian Labor Party members of the Parliament of New South Wales
Australian Catholic University alumni
Year of birth missing (living people)
Place of birth missing (living people)
Australian schoolteachers
21st-century Australian politicians